Cheongpyeong Lake (Hangul: 청평호, Hanja: 淸平湖) is an artificial lake that formed with the construction of Cheongpyeong Dam in the Bukhangang River, Cheongpyeong, Gapyeong County, Gyeonggi Province, Republic of Korea. 

Near Cheongpyeong Lake there is an amusement park as well as a number of summer homes. On the nearby lake there is water skiing and other recreations. Around Cheongpyeong Lake, there are approximately 30 boating areas for water skiing, motor boats, jet skis, banana boats, and other water activities.

References 

Lakes of South Korea